Wan Chai is a station on the  of the Hong Kong MTR. The livery colour is lime green. It serves the Wan Chai locality within the district of the same name. The station platforms are located underneath Hennessy Road, a major trunk road connecting the Central and Eastern districts.

History
The station was built under Southorn Playground. It opened along with the Island line on 31 May 1985. It was built by a Bachy Soletanche–Dragages joint venture. Entrance D was opened for public on 22 December 2017. Its passageway crosses underneath Southorn Playground and Johnston Road, then joins the underground mall in Lee Tung Street Redevelopment Project. It is expected to ease the overcrowding problem at entrance A3 and Johnston Road crossing.

Station layout

The platforms of Wan Chai station are constructed in a stacked arrangement, with Platform 1 above Platform 2.

Due to the large catchment of Wan Chai station and the locality as a business hub and centre for tourists, government offices, foreign embassies and institutions, the station houses more than 50 ticket gates as distributed across three ticket halls (two at the concourse and one at platform level). There are 8 station exits, two of which were constructed in 1999 to provide a more convenient reach for the southern areas of Wan Chai. The footbridge above O'Brien Road, which connects the Hong Kong Convention and Exhibition Centre, the Immigration Tower (Immigration Department of Hong Kong) and the Star Ferry Pier (Wan Chai Pier), was extended to reach one of these new exits above Hennessy Road.

The tunnel for eastbound trains towards Causeway Bay station has once featured a mobile advertisement, which was presented in the form of a slideshow across the length of the tunnel. The large number of sequential panels allowed passengers to view the advertisement as a slideshow, as trains undertakes their journey to the next station.

Usage and overcrowding
As the only railway station of Wan Chai and its Central Business District, this station serves a large number of residents and commuters. In reference to consultation document Our Future Railway, average train loading from Wan Chai to Causeway Bay is approximately 71%. Government consultant analysed that there would not be significant drop by 2031, even if train frequency would increase.

Entrances/exits
A1: Lockhart Road
A2: Hennessy Road (Northern Side)
A3: Johnston Road
A4: Hennessy Road (By Wanchai Computer Centre) 
A5: Hennessy Road Footbridge 
B1/B2: Southorn Playground
C: Lockhart Road
D: Lee Tung Avenue

References

MTR stations on Hong Kong Island
Island line (MTR)
Wan Chai
Railway stations in Hong Kong opened in 1985
1985 establishments in Hong Kong